Frank A. Miller (January 9, 1888 – June 25, 1931) was an American politician from New York.

Life
He was born on January 9, 1888, in Greenpoint, Brooklyn. He attended Public School No. 31. He worked for silent movie theaters as a musical director and sound effects engineer, and invented musical devices. On September 1, 1907, he married Agnes C. Baumann, and they had three children. In 1915, he opened his own business: the Lyceum Theatrical Booking Agency.

Miller was a member of the New York State Assembly (Kings Co., 20th D.) in 1922, 1923, 1924, 1925, 1926, 1927, 1928, 1929, 1930 and 1931.

He died on June 25, 1931.

Sources

1888 births
1931 deaths
Politicians from Brooklyn
Democratic Party members of the New York State Assembly
20th-century American politicians
People from Greenpoint, Brooklyn